Nueve de Julio is a town in the province of Corrientes, Argentina.

References
 

Populated places in Corrientes Province